Johan Christiaan Pietersen (born 18 May 1984) is a former South African rugby union player who also played as the fly-half for the San Diego Legion in Major League Rugby (MLR).

Professional career
In 2010, he joined Bayonne in France, but on 4 Nov 2011, he rejoined  on a 2-year deal.

He joined Japanese side Kamaishi Seawaves prior to the 2016–2017 Top East League season.

References

External links
Stormers profile

itsrugby.co.uk profile

1984 births
Living people
Afrikaner people
Alumni of Grey College, Bloemfontein
Aviron Bayonnais players
Expatriate rugby union players in Japan
Expatriate rugby union players in the United States
Kamaishi Seawaves players
Rugby union fullbacks
San Diego Legion players
South Africa international rugby sevens players
South African expatriate rugby union players
South African expatriate sportspeople in Japan
South African expatriate sportspeople in the United States
Stellenbosch University alumni
Stormers players
Western Province (rugby union) players
Biarritz Olympique players
Cheetahs (rugby union) players
Sharks (Currie Cup) players
Sharks (rugby union) players
South African rugby union players
Rugby union fly-halves
Rugby union wings